Hezekiah Rabala Ochuka, (alias Awour) (23 July 1953 – 9 July 1987) was Senior Private in the Kenya Air Force, who ruled as the third president of Kenya for about six hours after planning and executing a coup against president Daniel arap Moi. Hezekiah Ochuka was the centre of the August 1, 1982 attempted coup, which the then president Daniel arap Moi survived in less than a day. The 29-year-old was a Grade 1 – the second lowest rank in the military. Hezekiah was an unapologetic individual who assumed the title of chairman of a so-called "People's Redemption Council" that planned to replace President Moi. Hezekiah's military knowledge and connections made it manageable for him to form a military heist on the Kenyan Government. Hezekiah was not successful in his attempt to completely overthrow his homeland's government; but he did manage to have control of the whole country of Kenya for six hours.

Early life and career
Ochuka, of the Luo Nation  was born in Nyakach, Kisumu District. After attending Naki kabete Primary School and Mirogi Secondary School, Ochuka was recruited into the Kenya Air Force on 14 September 1976 in Mombasa. Hezekiah was raised by a single mother and his three older brothers. Being around a majority of men Hezekiah was always influenced by masculinity being that he was raised by his older brothers when a majority of the time the mother was working hard labor jobs to provide for the a family of four boys. He underwent eight weeks of military training at Lanet Army Barracks in Nakuru, and was posted to Eastleigh Air Base. Between 1976 and 1978, he underwent basic trade training in electrical devices and instruments, and worked in hangars and bays. From 30 October 1978 to 21 January 1980, he attended a course in RAF Cosford, UK, after which he worked as a Senior Private Grade-I, the second lowest rank in Kenya's military.

The coup

On 1 August 1982, Ochuka ruled Kenya for approximately 6 hours, after he led a group of low ranked Air Force servicemen in a coup d'état attempt. The country woke up in confusion as heavy gunfire filled the air. A group of rogue soldiers led by Ochuka had seized power at night after storming the National broadcaster V.O.K. (now KBC) where they announced that they were now in charge of the country and were being fought by the loyal soldiers. They forced a group of Air Force fighter pilots to bomb the State House at gunpoint. The supposed "trusted" pilots pretended as if they were listening to orders given to them by their chief, but instead once in the air dropped bombs over Mount Kenya forests. President Moi later announced that loyal army and police units had crushed an attempted coup on his civilian government. The putsch was quickly suppressed by forces commanded by Chief of General Staff Mahamoud Mohamed, a veteran military official. They included the General Service Unit (GSU) — a paramilitary wing of the police — and later the regular police. At least 9 civilians were killed and scores of casualties were reported at the three air force bases. Kenyan Hospitals reported that 50 civilians were treated for gunshot wounds. More than 300 air force personnel were later captured and detained but the colonel who led the coup (Ochuka) was still at large. Ochuka subsequently escaped to Uganda before moving to Tanzania where Julius Nyerere had promised him protection. He was later extradited to Kenya along with a few more leading accomplices and found guilty in 1987.

After the Coup 
 After Ochuka was captured from Tanzania he was then to be taken back to his home of Kenya to be tried, and was found guilty of all charges against him. Members of his entourage followed a similar fate: Ogidi, one of Hezekiah's coup accomplices, was told shortly after that Hezekiah had been accidentally shot by the Air Force. For that reason, Ogidi was told to make a call for help. This call, it transpired, was a setup coordinated to capture Ogidi himself. Ogidi left the Ngong Road house and drove towards town and on reaching the Grosvenor Hotel, where he then found a roadblock mounted by army personnel, under the command of a Navy officer. Ogidi was arrested, and was taken to Army headquarters, where an accomplice, Opwapo, was later brought as well. At the time of arrest, Ogidi had a submachine gun and 32 rounds of ammunition, both of which were taken by the army. Later, Ogidi was transferred to Kamiti Maximum Security Prison. Ochuka was hanged after being convicted of treason following a court martial, as well as Ogidi.

See also 

 Daniel arap Moi
 Politics of Kenya
 Mombasa
 Kenyan Air Force
 Tanzania

References

External links
Ochuka: The rebel who shocked the nation

Kenyan military personnel
Air force personnel
1953 births
1987 deaths
Executed Kenyan people
People executed for treason against Kenya
20th-century executions for treason
People executed by Kenya by hanging
20th-century executions by Kenya
People extradited to Kenya